Ivan J Myall (born 1947), is a male former swimmer who competed for England.

Swimming career
He represented England and won two bronze medals in the 4 x 100 and 4 x 200 metres freestyle relays, at the 1970 British Commonwealth Games in Edinburgh, Scotland.

References

1947 births
Living people
English male swimmers
Commonwealth Games medallists in swimming
Commonwealth Games bronze medallists for England
Swimmers at the 1970 British Commonwealth Games
Medallists at the 1970 British Commonwealth Games